Laat Saheb (Big Lord) is a Hindi language film released in 1946. The film was directed by K. P. Bhave for Harishchandra Pictures. It had music composed by B. Naik. The cast included Latika, Harishchandra Rao, Gope, Anees Katoon and Dalpat.

Cast
 Latika as Asha
 Harishchandra as Harish
 Bibi as Kusum
 Khatun as Billo
 Gope as Motaram
 Vasantrao as Jagdish
 Dalpat as Brijmohan
 Hari Kashmiri as Madhav
 Dhoomad as Manohar Vakil
 P. Mazumder as Balwant
 Laxman as Gangster
 Vithal as Gangster
 Dhondu as Gangster
 Yeshwant as Gangster
 Harish Butka as Gangster

References

External links
 

1946 films
1940s Hindi-language films
Indian action drama films
1940s action drama films
Indian black-and-white films
1946 drama films